Doris Pecher (born 20 September 1966) is a German diver. She competed in the women's 10 metre platform event at the 1988 Summer Olympics.

References

External links
 

1966 births
Living people
German female divers
Olympic divers of West Germany
Divers at the 1988 Summer Olympics
Sportspeople from Cologne
20th-century German women